The Boy Vs. the Cynic is the fourth album by John Reuben released in 2005 on Gotee Records. It features the hit "Nuisance".

Track listing 
 "Out of Control" — 3:50
 "Nuisance" (featuring Matthew Thiessen of Relient K) — 3:37
 "Chapter 1" — 2:49
 "Follow Your Leader" — 3:10
 "Sales Pitch" — 3:45
 "Sunshine" — 3:21
 "So Glad" (featuring Tim Skipper of House of Heroes) — 3:12
 "What About Them?" — 3:49
 "There's Only Forgiveness" — 4:07
 "All I Have" — 3:54
 "Cooperate" — 3:30
 "The Boy vs. The Cynic" — 6:19

All tracks were produced by Grant Harrison.

Awards 

In 2006, the album was nominated for two Dove Awards: Rap/Hip-Hop Album of the Year and Recorded Music Packaging of the Year, at the 37th GMA Dove Awards.

References 

2005 albums
John Reuben albums
Gotee Records albums